Bayview Avenue is a major north–south route in the Greater Toronto Area of Ontario. North of Toronto, in York Region, Bayview is designated as York Regional Road 34.

History

Over time, the concession road became known as East York Avenue, a reference to the division it formed between the city of Toronto and the township of East York. In 1931, James Stanley McLean constructed "Bay View" (now known as McLean House), a house overlooking the Don Valley with a view south down to Toronto Bay, on the edge of Moore Park and ultimately this led to the road becoming known as Bayview Avenue. On August 17, 1959, Bayview was extended south from Moore Avenue in Leaside to Front Street. The northern section of this extension was routed alongside Pottery Road to Nesbitt Drive. South of this, it wraps around a hill and descends into the Lower Don Valley, travelling parallel to the route of the Don Valley Parkway.

This addition is frequently referred to as the Bayview Extension. It was constructed as part of the Don Valley Parkway project, and necessitated the removal of "Sugarloaf Hill" directly north of the Bloor Street Viaduct. The extension fulfilled the "central spoke" in the building of the "Don Valley Roadway" as proposed in the 1940s. A route through the ravine to St. Clair Avenue was replaced with the present route which stays within the Don Valley proper. With the creations of the Corktown Common in 2013, the southern end of the Bayview Avenue Extension now terminates at Mill Street.

The list of streets removed or used to create the extension included:
 Don Roadway West – from Front Street to Winchester Street
 Marriott – from north of Bloor Street beginning at Park Drive (now Park Drive Reservation Trail)

In the late 1990s, York Region conducted several road needs studies near Lake Wilcox, which determined that the disjointed and disconnected Bayview Avenue should be connected from Stouffville Road in the south to Bloomington Road in the north. A lengthy battle ensued between environmentalists, upset over continuing construction in the supposedly protected Oak Ridges Moraine. The discovery of Jefferson salamanders in the study area resulted in several modifications to the design of the route, including a  structure over a dry ravine, as well as five amphibian tunnels. On November 17, 2002, the new extension was opened, including a widened intersection at Stouffville Road. The former route of Bayview was turned into several short streets (Olde Bayview Avenue, Sunset Beach Road and Bayview Park Lane), which lie directly west of the new roadway.

Bayview Avenue was once proposed to be renamed Kilgour Avenue by the town of Leaside, after Joseph Kilgour, whose widow sold his farm, Sunnybrook, to the city of Toronto on the condition that it never be developed. Today, Sunnybrook Hospital and Sunnybrook Park occupy those lands. While Bayview was never renamed, a recently constructed street south of the hospital carries the name Kilgour Road today.

Route description
The southern end of Bayview Avenue starts at Mill Street in Toronto’s Corktown Common. For the first part of its route northward it runs through the Don Valley, on the West side of the river opposite the Don Valley Parkway. Along this stretch a steep cliff separates it from neighbourhoods such as Cabbagetown.

Bayview exits the Don Valley, passing through the Governor's Bridge neighbourhood and entering Leaside. It is the major commercial street for Leaside, home to many small shops and restaurants. North of Leaside Bayview runs across several tributaries of the Don River and is carried over one of them by the six-lane Bayview Bridge. This is the western portion of the wealthy Lawrence Park neighbourhood, and just to the east is the Bridle Path, the single wealthiest area of Toronto. A number of major institutions are found in this area including Sunnybrook Health Sciences Centre, Glendon College, Toronto French School, The Granite Club, The Crescent School, and the Bob Rumball Centre for the Deaf.

North of York Mills Avenue Bayview becomes one of the major north-south arterials for suburban North York. It passes through the neighbourhoods of Bayview Village, Bayview Woods, Willowdale, and Newtonbrook.

It runs north beyond Steeles Avenue, Toronto’s northern city limit, and continues north through York Region, where it is formally identified as York Regional Road 34. It is one of the main arterial roads for Thornhill and Richmond Hill. It then passes through the Oak Ridges Moraine, passing a number of parks and conservation areas. North of the moraine the street again enters urban areas, passing through Aurora and Newmarket. It ends in Newmarket where it turns into Prospect Street.

Bayview Avenue is also home to major places of worship of almost every major religious tradition including synagogues, an Islamic mosque, the city’s largest evangelical churches, Canada’s largest Buddhist Temple, Toronto’s largest Eastern Orthodox cathedral, and Canada’s only Zoroastrian Temple. These can all be found along a 15-kilometre section of the road.

Transit
The TTC bus route that services most of the length of Bayview Avenue within Toronto is the 11 Bayview, with the 28 Bayview South running south of it.  Route 28 had originally been 28 Davisville, but it was modified in 2014. It now has full albeit less frequent service than the 11 Bayview route. From 2008-2014, the route ran its rush hour route on weekdays, then to the Brick Works during the day on weekends. In York Region, YRT runs Routes 54 and 91, with Route 91 and its branch routes serving the portion of Bayview south of Oak Ridges, and Route 54 serving Aurora and Newmarket. Within the Don River valley, much of Bayview runs parallel to the Richmond Hill GO Transit line.

The routes mainly serving Bayview Avenue are:

Toronto (TTC):

York Region (YRT):

Landmarks

See also
Bayview Ghost

References

Roads in Toronto